Anton Ackermann (born Eugen Hanisch, 25 November 1905 in Thalheim, Saxony; died 4 May 1973 in East Berlin) was an East German politician. In 1953, he briefly served as Minister of Foreign Affairs.

Life and career
From 1920 to 1928, he worked as functionary of the Communist Youth Movement of Germany. In 1926 he joined the Communist Party of Germany. He studied at the Lenin School in Moscow. Back in Germany, the Communist Party was expelled after the Nazis gained power in 1933. Ackermann continued working for the illegal Communist Party.

From 1935 to 1937 he lived in Prague. During the Spanish Civil War, Ackermann was the leader of the Political School of the International Brigades. After staying a short while, he went to Moscow and became editor of the German language newspaper "The Free Word".

In 1943 he became an active member of the Moscow-based National Committee for a Free Germany (NKFD).

After World War II, at the end of April 1945, he returned to Saxony as head of the Ackermann Group, one of the three teams, each of ten men, flown in by the Communist Party from Moscow to different parts of the Soviet occupation zone to lay the groundwork for the Soviet Military Administration in Germany. He joined the newly reformed East German Communist party, the Socialist Unity Party (SED) in 1946. He was elected into the Central Committee and became a candidate member of the Politburo in 1949. From 1950 to 1954, he was a member of the People's Chamber.

From 1949 to 1953, he was the Deputy Minister of Foreign Affairs. After the arrest of the minister, Georg Dertinger, Ackermann succeeded him, briefly, as Minister of Foreign Affairs.

In 1953–1954, he was expelled from the Politburo and Central Committee and fired as minister because of his factional opposition to party leader Walter Ulbricht.

In 1956 he was rehabilitated and worked for the State Planning Bureau.

In 1970 he was rewarded with the Patriotic Service Medal. Ill with cancer, he committed suicide in 1973.

See also 
 Wilhelm Zaisser
 Heinrich Rau

References

Further reading
 Buse, Dieter K. and Doerr, Juergen C., eds. Modern Germany: An Encyclopedia of History, People, and Culture, 1871–1990 (2 vol. Garland Pub., 1998) pp 6–7.

1905 births
1973 deaths
People from Erzgebirgskreis
People from the Kingdom of Saxony
Communist Party of Germany politicians
Candidate members of the Politburo of the Central Committee of the Socialist Unity Party of Germany
Foreign Ministers of East Germany
Members of the Provisional Volkskammer
Members of the 1st Volkskammer
German expatriates in Czechoslovakia
International Brigades personnel
National Committee for a Free Germany members
Refugees from Nazi Germany in the Soviet Union
International Lenin School alumni
Recipients of the Patriotic Order of Merit (honor clasp)
Suicides in East Germany
German politicians who committed suicide